FDJ may refer to:
 FDJ (cycling team)
 Djiboutian franc
 Faculty Dental Journal, a scholarly jo
Yhj
Vnvxx
urnal
 Française des Jeux (lottery), the operator of the French national lottery
 Free German Youth, a German socialist youth movement